Two ships of the Royal Australian Navy have been named HMAS Warramunga, after the Warumungu Aborigines.

 , a Tribal-class destroyer commissioned in 1942. The ship fought during the latter half of World War II, and in the Korean War. She was decommissioned in 1959, and sold for scrap.
 , an Anzac-class frigate commissioned in 2001 and in active service as of 2016

Battle honours
Six battle honours have been awarded to ships named HMAS Warramunga.

 Pacific 1943–45
 New Guinea 1943–44
 Leyte Gulf 1944
 Lingayen Gulf 1945
 Borneo 1945
 Korea 1951–52

References

Royal Australian Navy ship names